Chumashan was a family of languages that were spoken on the southern California coast by Native American Chumash people, from the Coastal plains and valleys of San Luis Obispo to Malibu, neighboring inland and Transverse Ranges valleys and canyons east to bordering the San Joaquin Valley, to three adjacent Channel Islands: San Miguel, Santa Rosa, and Santa Cruz.

The Chumashan languages may be, along with Yukian and perhaps languages of southern Baja such as Waikuri, one of the oldest language families established in California, before the arrival of speakers of Penutian, Uto-Aztecan, and perhaps even Hokan languages. Chumashan, Yukian, and southern Baja languages are spoken in areas with long-established populations of a distinct physical type. The population in the core Chumashan area has been stable for the past 10,000 years. However, the attested range of Chumashan is recent (within a couple thousand years). There is internal evidence that Obispeño replaced a Hokan language and that Island Chumash mixed with a language very different from Chumashan; the islands were not in contact with the mainland until the introduction of plank canoes in the first millennium AD.

All of the Chumashan languages are now extinct, although they are well-documented in the unpublished fieldnotes of linguist John Peabody Harrington. Especially well documented are Barbareño, Ineseño, and Ventureño. The last native speaker of a Chumashan language was Barbareño speaker Mary Yee, who died in 1965.

Family division

Languages

Six Chumashan languages are attested, all now extinct.  However, most of them are in the process of revitalization, with language programs and classes.  Contemporary Chumash people now prefer to refer to their languages by native names rather than the older names based on the local missions.

I. Northern Chumash
 1. Obispeño (also known as Northern Chumash) (†)
 Also known as Tilhini by students of the language, after the name of the major village near which the mission was founded.
II. Southern Chumash
 a. Island Chumash (mixed with non-Chumash)
 2. Island Chumash (also known as Ysleño, Isleño, Cruzeño) (†) Was spoken on the three inhabited islands in the Santa Barbara Channel Islands: Santa Rosa, San Miguel, and Santa Cruz. 
 b. Central Chumash
 3. Purisimeño (†)
 4. Samala (Ineseño) (†)
 Also spelled Sʰamala, spoken by the Santa Ynez Band.
 5. Šmuwič (Barbareño) (†)
 Also spelled Shmuwich by students of the language and community members. This is the name for the language and the people; it means "coastal."
 6. Mitsqanaqa'n (Ventureño) (†)
 Students of the language and community members renamed the language after the name of a major village near which the mission was founded.

Obispeño was the most divergent Chumashan language. The Central Chumash languages include Purisimeño, Ineseño, Barbareño and Ventureño.  There was a dialect continuum across this area, but the form of the language spoken in the vicinity of each mission was distinct enough to qualify as a different language.

There is very little documentation of Purisimeño. Ineseño, Barbareño and Ventureño each had several dialects, although documentation usually focused on just one.  Island Chumash had different dialects on Santa Cruz Island and Santa Rosa Island, but all speakers were relocated to the mainland in the early 19th century. John Peabody Harrington conducted fieldwork on all the above Chumashan languages, but obtained the least data on Island Chumash, Purisimeño, and Obispeño.  There is no linguistic data on Cuyama, though ethnographic data suggests that it was likely Chumash (Interior Chumash).

Post-contact
The languages are named after the local Franciscan Spanish missions in California where Chumashan speakers were relocated and aggregated between the 1770s and 1830s:
Obispeño—Mission San Luis Obispo de Tolosa
Purisimeño—Mission La Purísima Concepción
Ineseño—Mission Santa Inés
Barbareño—Mission Santa Barbara
Ventureño—Mission San Buenaventura

Genetic relations

Roland Dixon and Alfred L. Kroeber suggested that the Chumashan languages might be related to the neighboring Salinan in a Iskoman grouping. Edward Sapir accepted this speculation and included Iskoman in his classification of Hokan. More recently it has been noted that Salinan and Chumashan shared only one word, which the Chumashan languages probably borrowed from Salinan (the word meant 'white clam shell' and was used as currency). As a result, the inclusion of Chumashan into Hokan is now disfavored by most specialists, and the consensus is that Chumashan has no identified linguistic relatives.

Characteristics

The Chumashan languages are well known for their consonant harmony (regressive sibilant harmony). Mithun presents a scholarly synopsis of Chumashan linguistic structures.

Vowels 

The Central Chumash languages all have a symmetrical six-vowel system. The distinctive high central vowel is written various ways, including  "barred I,"  "schwa" and  "I umlaut."

Striking features of this system include

  Low-vowel harmony within morphemes:  Within a single morpheme, adjacent low vowels match: they are both or all front /e/, central /a/ or back /o/.  Pan-Central examples:
 expeč "to sing" — I/B/V
 ʼosos "heel" — I/B/V
 ʼasas "chin" — I/B/V
  Low-vowel harmony as a process:  Many prefixes include a low vowel which shows up as /a/ when the vowel of the following syllable is high.  When the vowel of the following syllable is low, the vowel of the prefix assimilates to (or "harmonizes" with) the front-central-back quality of the following vowel.  The verb prefix kal- "of cutting" illustrates this process in the following Barbareño examples, where the /l/ may drop out:
 kamasix "to cut into three pieces" — kal- + masix "three"
 keseqen "to cut out" — kal- + seqen "to remove"
 qoloq " to make or bore a hole, cut a hole in — kal- + loq "to be perforated"
 katun "to cut into two pieces" — kal- + =tun "of two, being two"

Consonants 

The Central Chumash languages have a complex inventory of consonants.  All of the consonants except /h/ can be glottalized; all of the consonants except /h/, /x/ and the liquids can be aspirated.

Proto-language

Proto-Chumash reconstructions by Klar (1977):

{| class="wikitable sortable"
! no. !! gloss !! Proto-Chumash !! Proto-Southern Chumash !! notes
|-
| 1 || advise, to || *si/umun ||  || 
|-
| 2 || all ||  || *yimlaʔ || 
|-
| 3 || alone || *l-ho ||  || 
|-
| 4 || already || *kVla- ||  || 
|-
| 5 || ant || *tkaya’ ||  || plus sound symbolism
|-
| 6 || armpit || *ti/uq’olo(lo) ||  || stem: *q'olo(lo)
|-
| 7 || arrive || *ki/um ||  || 
|-
| 8 || arrow ||  || *ya' || 
|-
| 9 || arroyo || *l’VmV ||  || 
|-
| 10 || ascend || *-nVpa ||  || 
|-
| 11 || ashamed, to be || *-nos- ||  || 
|-
| 12 || ashes || *qSa ||  || 
|-
| 13 || ask, to || *-VsqVnV ||  || 
|-
| 14 || back (body part) || *mVtV’ ||  || 
|-
| 15 || ball || *-apapa ||  || reduplicated stem
|-
| 16 || bat (animal) || *mVkala ||  || 
|-
| 17 || bathe, to || *k-ep’ ||  || 
|-
| 18 || bear (animal) || *qus ||  || 
|-
| 19 || bee || *olo ||  || plus sound symbolism
|-
| 20 || begin, to || *-nVna’ ||  || reduplicated stem?
|-
| 21 || blow, to || *aq-(tV)-p-; *-kVt || *-wu- || 
|-
| 22 || boil, to || *-wi- ||  || 
|-
| 23 || bone || *Se ||  || 
|-
| 24 || bow (noun) || *aqa ||  || 
|-
| 25 || break, to || *k’oto; *eqe ||  || 
|-
| 26 || breast || *kVtet ||  || 
|-
| 27 || breathe; breath || *kal-haS; *-haS ||  || 
|-
| 28 || bring, to || *kVlhi ||  || 
|-
| 29 || burn, to || *qi/ut ||  || 
|-
| 30 || cost, to || *piw’ ||  || 
|-
| 31 || carry, to || *kum ||  || 
|-
| 32 || carry on back, to || *sVpV ||  || 
|-
| 33 || cheek ||  || *po' || 
|-
| 34 || chest (body part) || *kVwV ||  || 
|-
| 35 || chia || *’epV- ||  || 
|-
| 36 || canoe ||  || *tomolo || 
|-
| 37 || clitoris || *Cele ~ *C’ele ||  || 
|-
| 38 || cold, to feel || *toqom ~ *qotom ||  || 
|-
| 39 || comb, to || *ti/ukikS ||  || 
|-
| 40 || come, to || *yit-i; *VlhVw ||  || 
|-
| 41 || concerned with, to be || *tak ||  || 
|-
| 42 || cooked || *pSel ||  || 
|-
| 43 || cough, to || *oqoqo- ||  || reduplicated stem; onomatopoetic
|-
| 44 || cover, to || *Vqmay ||  || 
|-
| 45 || crack, split, to || *-eqe ||  || 
|-
| 46 || cut, to || *’iwa ||  || plus reduplication
|-
| 47 || dark-colored, to be || *Soy ||  || 
|-
| 48 || day || *qSi; *-iSa- ||  || 
|-
| 49 || deaf || *tu’ ||  || 
|-
| 50 || deep || *l-hiy ||  || 
|-
| 51 || die, to || *qSa ||  || 
|-
| 52 || dirt || *uyu ||  || 
|-
| 53 || drink; thirsty, to be || *aq-mihi-l-ha; *o- ||  || 
|-
| 54 || ear || *tu’ ||  || 
|-
| 55 || earth ||  || *šup || 
|-
| 56 || eat, to || *uw ||  || 
|-
| 57 || eye, face || *tVq ||  || 
|-
| 58 || eyes, face, having to do with || *weqe ||  || 
|-
| 59 || far, to be || *mVkV ||  || 
|-
| 60 || fat || *qilhi ||  || 
|-
| 61 || fight, to || *aqi/u ||  || 
|-
| 62 || fire || *ne ||  || 
|-
| 63 || flower || *pey’ ||  || 
|-
| 64 || flea || *-tep (Proto-Central Chumash) ||  || 
|-
| 65 || fly (insect) || *axulpes ||  || 
|-
| 66 || follow, to || *pey ||  || 
|-
| 67 || food (cf. eat) || *uw- ||  || *uw- 'eat' plus *-mu (nominalizing suffix)
|-
| 68 || foot || *teme’ ||  || 
|-
| 69 || forget, to || *may ||  || 
|-
| 70 || full from eating, to be || *qti’ ||  || 
|-
| 71 || get up, to || *kVta’ ||  || 
|-
| 72 || gopher snake || *pSoSo ||  || reduplicated stem
|-
| 73 || grasshopper || *ti/uqu ||  || root: *-qu
|-
| 74 || gull sp. || *miyV ||  || 
|-
| 75 || hair, fur || *SuSV ||  || reduplicated stem?
|-
| 76 || hand || *pu ||  || 
|-
| 77 || hang, to || *wayan ~ *waya ||  || 
|-
| 78 || hear, to || *taq ||  || 
|-
| 79 || heel || *’ososo ||  || reduplicated stem
|-
| 80 || hello (greeting) || *haku ||  || 
|-
| 81 || hole || *loq ||  || 
|-
| 82 || hole, cave, den || *Si ~ *SiSV ||  || 
|-
| 83 || homosexual, to be || *’aqi’ ||  || 
|-
| 84 || jimson weed || *mom’oy ||  || from *moy
|-
| 85 || knee || *pVm’V ||  || 
|-
| 86 || knife || *’iw ||  || 
|-
| 87 || lie down, to || *toy’ ~ *ton’ ||  || 
|-
| 88 || liver || *c-al’a ||  || 
|-
| 89 || look, to || *kuti ~ *kuti’ ||  || 
|-
| 90 || louse || *Seke ||  || 
|-
| 91 || low tide || *qVw ||  || 
|-
| 92 || many, much || *equ ||  || 
|-
| 93 || meat, body || *’Vmin’ ||  || 
|-
| 94 || moist, to be || *so’ ||  || 
|-
| 95 || money; clam sp. || *’ala-qu-Cum ~ *’ana-qu-Cum ||  || *Cum is the root
|-
| 96 || mosquito || *pewe(we)’ ||  || 
|-
| 97 || mother-in-law || *mVSV ||  || 
|-
| 98 || mountain lion || *tVkem’ ||  || 
|-
| 99 || mouse || *qlo ||  || plus reduplication
|-
| 100 || mouth || *’Vk ||  || 
|-
| 101 || name || *ti ||  || 
|-
| 102 || neck || *ni’ ||  || 
|-
| 103 || necklace || *el’ ||  || 
|-
| 104 || nerve || *pilhil ||  || 
|-
| 105 || nest || *patV ~ *patV’ ||  || 
|-
| 106 || new, to be || *VmVn ||  || 
|-
| 107 || now || *kipV(’) ||  || 
|-
| 108 || oak spp. || *kuwu(’) ||  || 
|-
| 109 || one-eyed, to be || *ta’ ||  || 
|-
| 110 || open, to || *kal ||  || 
|-
| 111 || overcast, to be || *iqVmay ||  || 
|-
| 112 || pelican || *sew ||  || 
|-
| 113 || person || *ku ||  || 
|-
| 114 || pet || *qo’ ||  || 
|-
| 115 || pick up, lift, raise || *lay ||  || 
|-
| 116 || prickly pear || *qV’ ||  || 
|-
| 117 || quail || *takaka ||  || onomatopoetic
|-
| 118 || rabbit/jackrabbit || *ma’; *kuni’ ||  || 
|-
| 119 || rain, to || *tuhuy ~ *tuy ||  || 
|-
| 120 || red || *qupe ||  || 
|-
| 121 || roadrunner || *pu’ ||  || 
|-
| 122 || rub, to || *muy ||  || 
|-
| 123 || salt || *tepu(’) ~ *tipu(’) ||  || 
|-
| 124 || save (rescue), to || *apay ||  || 
|-
| 125 || seed || *’VmVn’ ||  || 
|-
| 126 || skunk || *tVqema ||  || 
|-
| 127 || smoke || *tuwo’ ||  || 
|-
| 128 || snail, sea || *q’VmV’ ||  || 
|-
| 129 || speak, say, to || *’ipi(’) ||  || 
|-
| 130 || split-stick rattle || *wanS-aq’a ~ *wacs-aq’a ||  || 
|-
| 131 || spread open || *kek-an ||  || 
|-
| 132 || squirrel, ground || *emet’ ~ *em’et’ ||  || 
|-
| 133 || steps || *tVyV- ||  || 
|-
| 134 || stick to, to || *pey ~ *pey’ ||  || 
|-
| 135 || sticky, to be || *pilhiy ||  || 
|-
| 136 || stone, rock || *qVpV ||  || 
|-
| 137 || straight || *tyiyeme ? ||  || 
|-
| 138 || swordfish || *’eleyewun’ ||  || 
|-
| 139 || tadpole || *qlo ~ *qyo ||  || root: 'small creature' (cf. mouse)
|-
| 140 || tail || *telheq’ ||  || 
|-
| 141 || take off, to || *qe ||  || 
|-
| 142 || tears || *tinik’ ||  || 
|-
| 143 || tongue || *’elhew’ ||  || 
|-
| 144 || tooth || *Sa ||  || 
|-
| 145 || urinate, to || *Sol’ ||  || 
|-
| 146 || vomit || *paS(V) ||  || 
|-
| 147 || walk, to || - ||  || 
|-
| 148 || warm self, to || *mol ||  || 
|-
| 149 || water || *’o’ ||  || 
|-
| 150 || whale || *paqat(V) ||  || 
|-
| 151 || wood, tree, stick || *pono’ ||  || 
|-
| 152 || woodpecker || *pVlak’a(k’) ||  || 
|-
| 153 || wrinkled || *Sok’ ||  || plus reduplication
|-
| 154 || yawn || *San ||  || plus reduplication
|-
| 155 || yellow jacket || *ɨyɨ ~ *ɨyɨ’ ||  || 
|}

See also
 Rock art of the Chumash people
 Burro Flats Painted Cave
 Population of Native California
 Native Americans in the United States

Notes

Bibliography

 Campbell, Lyle. (1997). American Indian languages: The historical linguistics of Native America. New York: Oxford University Press. .
 Dixon, Roland R.; & Kroeber, Alfred L. (1913). New Linguistic Families in California. American Anthropologist 15:647-655.
 Goddard, Ives (Ed.). (1996). Languages. Handbook of North American Indians (W. C. Sturtevant, General Ed.) (Vol. 17). Washington, D. C.: Smithsonian Institution. .
 Klar, Kathryn. (1977). Topics in historical Chumash grammar. (Doctoral dissertation, University of California, Berkeley).

 Mithun, Marianne. (1999). The languages of Native North America. Cambridge: Cambridge University Press.  (hbk); .
 Grant, Campbell. (1978). Chumash:Introduction. In California Handbook of North American Indians (William C. Sturtevant, General Ed.) Vol. 8 (Robert F. Heizer, Volume Ed.). Washington, D. C.: Smithsonian Institution.
 Sapir, Edward. (1917). The Position of Yana in the Hokan Stock. University of California Publications in American Archaeology and ethnology 13:1–34. Berkeley: University of California.

 
Language families
Indigenous languages of California